Brian Gaia (born April 15, 1994) is an American football guard who is currently a free agent. He played college football at Penn State. He was a captain of the team, and received an All-Big Ten honorable mention. He was part of the last recruiting class by Penn State coach, Joe Paterno. Gaia auditioned for the Cleveland Browns following the 2017 NFL Draft, but was not signed to a contract.

References

Living people
American football offensive guards
1994 births